ㅛ (yo) is a jamo, the smallest component of the Korean hangul writing system. The Unicode for ㅛ is U+315B.

Stroke order

Hangul jamo
Vowel letters